Misiewicz is a surname. People with this surname include:
Ann Misiewicz , Australian basketball player
Anthony Misiewicz (born 1994), American baseball player 
Josh Misiewicz (born 1988), American paralympian
Michał Misiewicz (born 1990), Canadian soccer player

Surnames of Polish origin